General elections were held in Antigua and Barbuda on 17 April 1984, the first after the country had become an independent Commonwealth realm in 1981.

The result was a victory for the governing Antigua Labour Party (ALP), whose leader Vere Bird was reelected as Prime Minister of Antigua and Barbuda. In contrast, the opposition vote was split between George Walter's new political vehicle, the United People's Movement, and the Progressive Labour Movement, Walter's former party from his pre-independence term as Premier. The only non-ALP seat was won by a pro-ALP independent from Barbuda. Voter turnout was 61.1%.

Results

References

Antigua
Elections in Antigua and Barbuda
General election
April 1984 events in North America